Horst is a male given name used mostly in German-speaking countries.

Etymology/meaning 

The name is of Old High German origin, meaning "man from the forest", "bosk" or "brushwood". 
In modern German, "Horst" is also a translation of English aerie, the nest of an eagle or other bird.

Notable people named Horst
 Horst Buchholz (1933–2003), German actor
 Horst Bulau (born 1962), Canadian ski jumper
 Horst Eckel (1932–2021), German footballer
 Horst Feistel (1915–1990), German cryptographer
 Horst Fischer (1912–1966), German SS concentration camp doctor executed for war crimes
 Horst P. Horst (1906–1999), German photographer
 Horst Hrubesch (born 1951), German footballer 
 Horst Jankowski (1936–1998), German pianist
 Horst Janson (actor) (born 1935), German actor
 Horst Köhler (born 1943), former Federal President of Germany
 Horst Lademacher (born 1931), German historian
 Horst Mahler (born 1936), German rightist and ex-Rote Armee Fraktion member
 Horst Mahseli (1934–1999), Polish footballer
 Horst Muhlmann (1940–1991), German-born American football player
 Horst Peissker (born 1927), German biochemist
 Horst Rechelbacher (1941–2014), Austrian-American businessman
 Horst Salomon (1929–1972), German novelist and screenwriter
 Horst Seehofer (born 1949), minister-president of Bavaria
 Horst Simco (born 1982), American rapper also known as Riff Raff (rapper)
 Horst Sindermann (1915–1990), German politician
 Horst Tappert  (1923–2008), German actor
 Horst Wessel (1907–1930), German National Socialist political activist, assassinated in Weimar Germany

German masculine given names